International law encompasses the protection of human rights, in both conflict situations and post-conflict reconstruction. The Convention on the Elimination of All Forms of Discrimination against Women (CEDAW) was adopted by the United Nations General Assembly in 1979 and has the goal of promoting women's rights.  Women have contributed to work on the ground in post-conflict reconstruction, aid and ceasefire negotiations. They have also contributed to the Geneva II peace talks regarding Syria, and were involved in the Rohingya situation in Myanmar as 'front-line responders'. ]

International law mechanisms 

The Convention on the Elimination of All Forms of Discrimination against Women (CEDAW) was adopted by the United Nations General Assembly on 18 December 1979, thirty years after the establishment of the UN Commission on the Status of Women. The goals of the commission were to promote women's rights and address systematic discrimination experienced by women. The rights covered in CEDAW includes women's political participation, education, health, employment, marriage and legal equality. CEDAW also advocates for a change in the traditional roles of men and women. 

The adoption of Resolution 1325 by the UN Security Council on 31 October 2000, stated the role women can play in conflict prevention and resolution, peace processes and post-conflict reconstruction.  This resolution was the first time that the UN Security Council addressed the impact of armed conflict on women.  UNSCR 1325 encourages all actors to increase the participation of women in these processes and to implicate mechanisms that will protect women and girls who may be victims to violence on the basis of gender in conflict situations, such as rape and sexual abuse. Subsequent research undertaken since the adoption of UNSCR 1325 has addressed the involvement of women in peace and security, and is now consolidated under the "Women, Peace and Security Agenda." Additionally, evidence collected by UN Women illustrated the correlation between conflict prevention and gender equality. In 2016, the report found a 20% reduction in peace agreements containing gender-specific provisions, dropping from 70% to 50%.

Democratic Republic of the Congo: Violence against women 

Some academic research completed surrounding gender inequality have included Democratic Republic of the Congo (DRC) in their case studies.  Women and girls have been found to be targets within DRC conflicts, including crimes such as rape, forced prostitution and forced marriage. Up to six million people were killed in the wars lasting approximately two decades. Some reasons for the conflict include the DRC's mineral wealth and natural resources  Crimes against civilians, including predominantly towards women and girls have not been subject to formal prosecution. These acts include gang rape (which accounts for a majority of  cases), public rape, instrumental rape and female genital mutilation.

The UN Population Fund concluded that over 8,000 acts of sexual violence occurred in 2009 and 2010 in the DRC. By 2011, it was estimated that 1,152 women were raped every day, calculated at 48 women per hour. In 2014, reported cases of rape in the DRC were increasing. Gender-based and sexual violence is high in the East, with this violence persisting due to high insecurity. Another reason is the high level of impunity met with acts of sexual assault, as the judicial system is under-resourced and the social status of women in the DRC remains low, whereby there exists a social stigma surrounding female rape victims. Additionally, displacement, insecurity and continuing conflict increase violence against women and girls, by other members of the community as well as armed groups.

Since 2006, developments have been made at the national and international levels to directly address violence against women and girls in the DRC. In 2006, the Congolese government adopted a new law providing a legal framework criminalising acts of sexual mutilation, sexual slavery, sexual relations with underage children, and the use of instruments in sexual violence. This has been designed to combat informal settlements between perpetrators and the families of victims, such as forced marriages between the victim and her rapist. The UN has since adopted the Comprehensive Strategy on Combating Sexual Violence in the DRC, focusing on combating impunity; preventing violence; reformation of the security sector; and assistance for survivors. Additionally, the UN Security Council has since adopted Resolutions 1856 (2008), 1888 (2009) and 1960 (2010) to condemn sexual violence in conflict situations, building on Resolution 1325 in its advocacy of women's involvement in peace process and post-conflict reconstruction.

Within Congolese society there exists a stigma surrounding female rape victims, whereby they are ostracised from their families and communities. In 2017, the international campaign "16 Days of Activism" (established 1991) to end violence against women and girls, saw governments, activists, men, women and civil society collectively promote human rights. On November 25, 2017, UN agencies, media, civil society, government officials and students gathered in Kinshasa to launch the 2017 campaign theme "Leave No One Behind: End Violence Against Women and Girls." This included school competitions in which students answered questions about the texts and laws designed to protect women and girls from gender-based violence.

Syria: Women's involvement in the peace talks 

Due to the Syrian civil war, Syrian women and girls have been vulnerable to sexual and gender-based violence, marginalisation and poverty. As a result, there has been approximately 500 000 deaths and an  unprecedented number of refugees. While both women and men are subjected to gender-based violence, women and girls have statistically been the greater targets of these acts. Pre-existing gender inequalities put women and girls at a greater risk of violence, trafficking, forced marriage and exploitation. Few women participated in the Geneva II peace talks, although not formally. In 2012, UN Women reviewed 31 peace processes, in which 4% of peace agreements contained female signatories. A study undertaken by the Council on Foreign Relations in 2018 found that between 1990 and 2017, 19% of peace agreements contained references to women.

Women have predominantly been actors at the local level, and not in the formal peace negotiations, addressing the consequences of civil war by assisting internally displaced peoples and survivors of sexual violence, engaging in ‘cross-community dialogue’ and working in factories at their own personal risk.  Women have led non-violent protests to release detainees, continue to work in field hospitals and schools, distribute aid and supplies, and "document human rights violations." 

On 6 January 2014, the Syrian Women's Charter was created in Damascus, advocating an end to violence and for Syrian unity to create a Syria that will more greatly recognise and uphold the basic human rights of its nation.  They have made active proposals for civil society participation and have worked together despite political affiliations and personal differences. Additionally, the Syrian Women's Political Movement has been created and aims towards a 30% quota to ensure women's participation in conflict resolution processes. The "It Takes a Woman" campaign was launched by UN Women in 2017 to raise awareness of Syrian women activists involved in both formal and informal peace processes, highlighting public debate over women's right to participate in the ongoing peace processes.

Myanmar: Rohingya women respond to the ongoing crisis 

In Western Myanmar, the Rohingya population continues to be affected by mass killings, village destruction and gang rapes perpetrated by Myanmar's security forces  The attacks began Myanmar's Rakhine State in August 2017, leading to ongoing violence. Since then, approximately 650 000 people have crossed into neighbouring Bangladesh, with tens of thousands displaced within the Rakhine state. Women and girls have been affected by issues such as mutilation, gang rape, forcible detention and burned to death (Refugees International 2018). Exact statistics are unknown, due to difficulties in documentation of sexual violence. In the camp in Bangladesh's Cox Bazar, up to 600 000 refugees live in crowded conditions, with girls from 11 said to be forced to marry by their families.

Statistics show that the representation of women in Myanmar's peace talks remains low. In the April 2016 peace talks, women accounted for 13% of the 700 delegates, increasing to 17% in May 2017. 4% of the 48-member peace committee were women. In the conflict zone, women operate as 'front-line responders', mostly taking care of other women in roles ranging from midwives to caseworkers, and providing information about services, safety, and human rights to the community. In October 2017, the Committee on the Elimination of Discrimination against Women (CEDAW) and the Committee on the Rights of the Child (CRC) called on Myanmar to stop the violence in the Rakhine State and to investigate cases of violence against women and children.

References 

International law
Feminism and law
Women activists